Rumen Alabakov (born 2 August 1965) is a Bulgarian wrestler. He competed in the men's freestyle 90 kg at the 1988 Summer Olympics.

References

1965 births
Living people
Bulgarian male sport wrestlers
Olympic wrestlers of Bulgaria
Wrestlers at the 1988 Summer Olympics
People from Asenovgrad